Parliamentary elections were held in Yugoslavia, with voting on 23 March 1958 for the 301-member Federal Council, whilst the Producers' Council was elected on 30 March, with the two councils forming the bicameral Federal People's Assembly.

Almost all candidates ran unopposed, with only six of the 301 seats in the Federal Council having been contested by more than one candidate. Around 40% of the candidates for the Federal Council and 80% of candidates for the Producers' Council were running for the first time.

References

Yugoslavia
Parliamentary election
Elections in Yugoslavia
Yugoslavian parliamentary election
One-party elections
Election and referendum articles with incomplete results